Baker's Dozen is an American sitcom that aired on CBS from March 17 to June 30, 1982.

Synopsis
Filmed on location in New York City, the series centered around the off-beat antics of an undercover anti-crime unit of the NYPD.

Cast
Ron Silver as Mike Locasale
Cindy Weintraub as Terry Munson
Alan Weeks as Otis Kelly
Sam McMurray as Harve Schoendorf
Thomas Quinn as Sgt. Martin
Doris Belack as Captain Florence Baker

Episodes

References

External links

CBS original programming
1982 American television series debuts
1982 American television series endings
1980s American sitcoms
1980s American workplace comedy television series
Fictional portrayals of the New York City Police Department
Television shows set in New York City
English-language television shows